The Vault is a collection of 12 previously unreleased songs by R&B singer Ashanti, released in Japan on February 18, 2009, and in the US on May 19 by AJM Records and The Orchard. The songs were written during Ashanti’s teenage years and some songs were used as demos for later songs, in addition the majority of the song lyrics can be found in her previously released book of poetry “Reflections on Love” (2002). The songs were recorded while Ashanti was still under contract to AJM and before she signed with Murder Inc Records. Further production was added before the album's release in 2009. The collection was released without input or support from Ashanti. It was released in Japan on February 18, 2009, as the first project in the Avex Group–The Orchard alliance. According to Billboard, "Let's Do Something Crazy" featuring Flo Rida was lined up as the album's first single, followed by "Imagine Life".

Track listing
 "Imagine Life" – 3:52
 "Don't Need You" – 3:43
 "Let's Do Something Crazy" (featuring Flo Rida) – 4:08
 "Pretty Little Flower" (featuring J Star) – 3:45
 "Where I Stand" – 4:12
 "Satisfy" – 3:42
 "Show You" – 4:11
 "Mrs. So So" – 3:19
 "No Words" – 3:50
 "Saw Your Face" – 4:02
 "Girls in the Movies" – 3:37
 "To the Club" – 4:21
 "Summertime" – 3:34
Bonus tracks
 "To the Club" (Remix) (Amazon MP3 exclusive) – 3:27
 "Gotta Get Out" (Migs Mix) (iTunes bonus track) – 4:13

Charts

References

Ashanti (singer) albums
2009 compilation albums
The Orchard (company) albums
Avex Group compilation albums